Sepideh Shamlou (in Persian: سپیده شاملو) is an Iranian award-winner writer. She has written several novels in Persian. She was born in 1968 in Iran. She obtained a BS in English. Sepideh Shamlou started off writing film pieces, but with the release of It was as if you had said that Lily, she then became a novelist. She was among the many female authors who started writing in the 1990s onwards. Her novel titled As you had told Leyli was awarded a Hooshang Golshiri Literary Award for Best First Novel in 2000. She was interviewed by Haft magazine in 2006 on her novel. She was also interviewed by Etemaad newspaper in 2007.

Books 
As you had told Leyli, 2011 (first published in 2000) (novel) 
Your redness from me, 2006 (novel) 
Red glove (collection of short stories)

Awards and recognition
 2000 Hooshang Golshiri Literary Awards, Best First Novel, As if You Had Said Leyli
 Sepideh Shamlou was a judge for the 7th Sadegh Hedayat Literary Award in 2009.

References

Sources 
گفتگو با سپیده شاملو

External links 
انگار گفته بودي ليلي – سپيده شاملو

1968 births
Living people
Iranian writers
Iranian women short story writers